Kevin M. Ross is an American academic administrator. He is president of Lynn University. Ross became the institution's fifth president on July 1, 2006, succeeding his father, Donald E. Ross, who was president for 35 years.  He is a founding board member of Boca Raton Educational Television, a member of the Board of Directors of Literacy Coalition of Palm Beach County, an Advisory Board member of Pope John Paul II High School and on the Lynn University Board of Trustees.

Prior to his appointment as president, he was chief operating officer of the university while his dad was President of the University. During that time he initiated Lynn 2020, a 15-year plan for the future of the school.

In October 2006, he announced the money for a formal inauguration would instead be spent on an Innovation Prize to fund projects benefiting the university.

He has two children, Ainsley and Graham.

Education
Doctor of Education, Vanderbilt University, Peabody College of Education, 2006
Master of Arts in Liberal Arts, St. John's College, 1997
Bachelor of Arts in English, Colgate University, 1994

References

Year of birth missing (living people)
Living people
Heads of universities and colleges in the United States
Colgate University alumni
People from Boca Raton, Florida
St. John's College (Annapolis/Santa Fe) alumni
Vanderbilt University alumni
Wilmington University
American chief operating officers